Abdul Majid Bhurgri Institute of Language Engineering is an autonomous body under the administrative control of the Culture, Tourism and Antiquities Department, Government of Sindh established for bringing Sindhi language at par with national and international languages in all computational process and Natural language processing.

Establishment
In recognition to services of Abdul-Majid Bhurgri, who is the founder of Sindhi computing, Government of Sindh has established the institute after his name. The institute was primarily initiated on the concept given by a language engineer and linguist Amar Fayaz Buriro in briefing to the Minister, Culture, Tourism and Antiquities, Government of Sindh, Syed Sardar Ali Shah on 21 February 2017 on celebration of International Mother Language Day in Sindhi Language Authority, Hyderabad, Sindh. After the presentation and concept given by Amar Fayaz Buriro, the minister Syed Sardar Ali Shah had announced the Institute. Then, Government of Sindh added the development scheme in the Budget of fiscal year 2017-2018.

Location
The institute is established behind Sindh Museum and Sindhi Language Authority, N-5 National Highway, Qasimabad, Hyderabad, Sindh.

See also
 Sindhi language
 Abdul-Majid Bhurgri
 Sindhi Language Authority

References

Sindhi language
Government agencies of Sindh
Natural language processing
Information technology in Pakistan
Computer science institutes in Pakistan
Information technology companies of Pakistan